Comalies is the third studio album by Italian gothic metal band Lacuna Coil, released on 29 October 2002 through Century Media Records. According to lead singer Cristina Scabbia, "[During the album's recording], we had a sort of creative explosion. We were working in a coma, sort of like in a different dimension. First of all we just wanted to use the word 'coma' but there was something missing so we played with the two words coma and lies." Comalies peaked at #178 on the Billboard 200 and Peaked at #9 on the Top Heatseekers and Independent Albums charts. The outline of the shape from the cover of the band's previous album Unleashed Memories (2001) is faintly visible on top of the sunflower. The album has gone on to sell over 300,000 copies in the United States as of January 2012.

The song "Swamped" is available as a downloadable track for the music video game series Rock Band, and also appeared in the 2004 video game Vampire: The Masquerade – Bloodlines.

In 2022 for the album's 20th anniversary, Lacuna Coil rerecorded Comalies in its entirety under the name Comalies XX. The album was released on October 14.

Reception
Upon release, Comalies received universal acclaim from both music critics and band fans. In 2005, the album was ranked 415th in Rock Hard magazine's book The 500 Greatest Rock & Metal Albums of All Time. In 2016, it was ranked the 59th-greatest album of the 21st century by Metal Hammer.

Track listing

Multimedia section
The making of Comalies – 6:40

Ozzfest edition bonus disc

CD2 multimedia section
 Heaven's a Lie (video)
 Swamped (video)
 Desktop wallpapers

Personnel
 Andrea Ferro – male vocals
 Cristina Scabbia – female vocals
 Marco "Maus" Biazzi – lead guitar
 Cristiano "Pizza" Migliore – rhythm guitar
 Marco Coti Zelati – bass, keyboards
 Cristiano "Criz" Mozzati – drums, percussion

Release history

Chart performance

References

Lacuna Coil albums
Century Media Records albums
2002 albums
Albums produced by Waldemar Sorychta